M.A.T. or MAT may refer to:

 Master of Arts in Teaching, a graduate degree in teaching
 Mission Against Terror, a 2011 video game
 Muzzle action trigger, often used in the US military and ROTC rifle programs
 Multi-Axis Trainer, another name for an Aerotrim
 Multi-Academy Trust, a not for profit organisation that contains one or more Academy schools, which are state funded schools in England. They are directly funded by the Department of Education, but free from Local Authority control.